The R373 road is a regional road in central County Mayo in Ireland. It connects the N60 road at Kilkenny, near Breaffy, to the R310 road in Castlebar.

The government legislation that defines the R373, the Roads Act 1993 (Classification of Regional Roads) Order 2012 (Statutory Instrument 54 of 2012), provides the following official description:

R373: Breaffy — Castlebar, County Mayo

Between its junction with N60 at Kilkenny in the county of Mayo and its junction with the R310 at Bridge Street in the town of Castlebar via Drumconlan in the county of Mayo: Springfield, Lower Charles Street and Lucan Street in the town of Castlebar.

See also
List of roads of County Mayo
National primary road
National secondary road
Regional road
Roads in Ireland

References

Regional roads in the Republic of Ireland
Roads in County Mayo